The Military Committee of the Congolese Party of Labour was a military Committee which briefly ruled the People's Republic of the Congo between 18 March 1977 and 3 April 1977.

Membership in 1977 
Col. Joachim Yhombi-Opango, Head of State
Maj. Denis Sassou Nguesso, Defense Minister
Maj. Louis Sylvain Goma, Prime Minister
Maj. Raymond Damase Ngollo
Maj. Pascal Bima
Maj. Jean-Michel Ebaka
Maj. Martin M'Bia
Capt. François-Xavier Katali, Interior Minister
Capt. Nicholas Ockongo
Capt. Florent Ntsiba
Lt. Pierre Anga

See also
List of heads of state of the Republic of the Congo

References

Presidents of the Republic of the Congo